The Iron Stair (1933) is a British crime film directed by Leslie S. Hiscott and starring Henry Kendall, Dorothy Boyd, and Michael 
Hogan. The film was a quota quickie produced by Twickenham Studios.

Cast
 Henry Kendall as Geoffrey
 Dorothy Boyd as Eva Marshall
 Michael Hogan as Pat Derringham
 Michael Sherbrooke as Benjamin Sherbrooke
 Steffi Duna as Elsa Damond
 A. Bromley Davenport as Sir Andrew Gale
 Victor Stanley as Ben
 Charles Paton as Sloan
 John Turnbull as Major Gordon

References

External links
BFI Database entry

1933 films
1933 crime films
British crime films
1930s English-language films
Films shot at Twickenham Film Studios
Films directed by Leslie S. Hiscott
Quota quickies
British black-and-white films
1930s British films